Albert Vivian D'Costa, MBE (1904–1994) was an administrator and architect of the Indian Railways during its inception.

Early life 
He was born on July 4, 1904, at Quitula Aldona, India. He studied in Bombay. He earned a B.Sc. (Mathematics) and Bachelor of Civil Engineering.

Career 
In 1930 he was appointed assistant executive engineer following a nationwide competitive examination. In April 1945 he was promoted executive engineer.

Central Railway 
In December 1947 he reached junior administrative grade as architect on the Central Railway. He was placed on special duty by the Ministry of Railways for investigations in regard to the establishment of an integrated coach factory for all Indian railways. He was in charge of major construction projects for the Central Railway until 1949. He simultaneously held responsibility for the girder and steel workshops at Manmad.

Deputy Chief Engineer 
He became Deputy Chief Engineer and joint Architect for Central and Western Railways.

Ministry of Railways 
In March 1953 he was transferred to the research and standards organization of the Ministry of Railways as joint Director of research in buildings, soil mechanics and concretes. He was placed in charge of the research station at Lonavla. In less than three years he moved to the transportation department as Divisional Transportation Superintendent, Bombay division.

In March 1957 he was posted to special duty as Secretary of the Expert Bridge Committee to investigate defective bridges. In January 1958 he reached Senior Administration Grade (Department Head) and Director of Standards (Civil) of the Ministry. He then became Principal at the Railway Administrative Staff College. In 1959 he was transferred to the Railway Board as Director, Civil Engineering.

Post retirement 
He retired in 1964 but was recalled by the planning commission to take charge as leader of the Metropolitan Transport study team for major metropolitan cities in India until 1976.

Recognition 
He was honored as a M.B.E. He was ex-President (Bombay Central) of permanent way institute, United Kingdom and Fellow of Indian Standards Institute.

Indian Railways officers
Engineers from Goa
1904 births
1994 deaths
People from North Goa district
20th-century Indian engineers
Members of the Order of the British Empire